The Japan women's junior national handball team is the national under-19 handball team of Japan. It is controlled by the Japan Handball Association and is an affiliate of the International Handball Federation as well as a member of the Asian Handball Federation. The team represents Japan in international matches.

World Championship record
 Champions   Runners up   Third place   Fourth place

References

External links

Women's handball in Japan
Women's national junior handball teams
Handball